Rhynchocalamus is a genus of snakes in the family Colubridae.

Species
The following species are recognized as being valid.
Rhynchocalamus arabicus 
Rhynchocalamus dayanae 
Rhynchocalamus levitoni Torki, 2017
Rhynchocalamus melanocephalus 
Rhynchocalamus satunini 

Nota bene: A binomial authority in parentheses indicates that the species was originally described in a genus other than Rynchocalamus.

Taxonomy
The species formerly known as Rhynchocalamus barani has been assigned to the monotypic genus Muhtarophis as Muhtarophis barani.

References

Further reading
Günther A (1864). "Report on a Collection of Reptiles and Fishes from Palestine". Proc. Zool. Soc. London 1864: 488–493. (Rhynchocalamus, new genus, p. 491).

Rhynchocalamus
Snake genera
Taxa named by Albert Günther